"Wile Out" is a single by DJ Zinc featuring vocals from Ms. Dynamite. It was released on 7 February 2010 as a digital download in the United Kingdom. The song peaked at number 38 on the UK Singles Chart and number 4 on the UK Dance Chart.

Music video
A music video to accompany the release of "Wile Out" was first released onto YouTube on 23 January 2010 at a total length of two minutes and fifty-five seconds.

Track listing

iTunes Download

Vato Gonzalez Remix

Chart performance

Certifications

Release history

References

External links
Official website

Ms. Dynamite songs
DJ Zinc songs
Songs written by Ms. Dynamite
Songs written by DJ Zinc
2010 singles
2010 songs